The 1960 USAC Road Racing Championship season was the third season of the USAC Road Racing Championship.  It began April 3rd, 1960, and ended October 23rd, 1960, after five races.  Carroll Shelby won the season championship.

Calendar

Season results

External links
World Sports Racing Prototypes: 1960 USAC Road Racing Championship
Racing Sports Cars: USAC Road Racing Championship archive

1960
1960 in motorsport
1960 in American motorsport